General elections were held in Singapore on 7 May 2011. President S. R. Nathan dissolved parliament on 19 April 2011 on the advice of Prime Minister Lee Hsien Loong. Voting is mandatory in Singapore and is based on the first-past-the-post system. Elections are conducted by the Elections Department, which is under the jurisdiction of the Prime Minister's Office. Nomination day was held on 27 April 2011, and for the second election in a row, the PAP did not return to government on nomination day, but it did return to government on polling day. This election also marked the first and the only three-cornered fight since 2001 in Punggol East SMC before it increased to four-cornered fight on a by-election held two years later.

The election was described as a "watershed election" in various forms by various parties. The ruling PAP reminded voters that the election will determine "Singapore's next generation of leaders". The Workers' Party called it a "watershed election" both for Singapore and the opposition, as it marked the first time in two decades that the only two incumbent opposition MPs moved out of their respective strongholds and contested in Group Representation Constituencies (GRCs), risking a situation where there would be "no elected opposition MPs". This was despite the elections having the highest proportion of contested seats since independence, with 82 of 87 seats contested (or 94.3%). 2011 was the year that saw the highest number of seats contested since post-independence; with the second being in 1972 when 87.7% of seats were contested (or 57 out of 65 seats),  It marked the first electoral contests in Bishan–Toa Payoh (since 1991) and  Holland–Bukit Timah, and also marked Tanjong Pagar as the only constituency to remain uncontested since its formation in 1991.

The final results saw a 6.46% swing against the PAP from the 2006 elections to 60.14%, its lowest since independence. While the PAP met most expectations to sweep into power and claim over two-thirds of parliamentary seats, winning 81 out of 87 seats, it however lost Aljunied Group Representation Constituency to the Workers' Party of Singapore a historic breakthrough that a GRC was won by an opposition party. Including the Hougang Single Member Constituency, the Workers' Party ended up with six seats in Parliament, the best opposition parliamentary result since independence.

As six Members of Parliament from the opposition were elected, only three Non-Constituency Member of Parliament seats were offered, one to Lina Chiam from the Singapore People's Party and the other 2 seats to Yee Jenn Jong and Gerald Giam from the Worker's Party. These offers were all accepted, resulting in a total of nine opposition MPs after the election.

This election marked the very first time that the total eligible voter population in contested seats as well as voter turnout exceeded 2 million people. Furthermore, with 94.05% of the total voters (in 82 seats) seeing contests in their constituencies, this was the "most active" election in Singapore's history between 1968 and 2011. This was also the last election to see a walkover as subsequent elections saw all constituencies being contested for the first time since 1963.

Background
The 2011 General Election was the 16th General Election in Singapore and the 11th since independence. The governing People's Action Party (PAP) sought to secure their 13th consecutive term in office since 1959. This was the second election since Lee Hsien Loong became its Secretary-General.

Parliamentary reform
On 11 March 2010, the Government tabled three bills in the parliament to amend the Constitution, the Presidential Elections Act and the Parliamentary Elections Act. These amendments reduced the number of Group representation constituencies (GRC), increased the number of Non-Constituency Members of Parliament (NCMPs) to a maximum of nine (inclusive of the number of elected opposition members of Parliament), and the number of Nominated Members of Parliament (NMPs) permanent also to nine. A one-day "cooling-off" day was implemented, during which campaigning was forbidden, with only party political broadcasts allowed. Internet campaigning was also formally legalised as a legitimate means of political campaigning. On 26 April 2010, the amendments to the Constitution were passed by a vote of 74–1 after a three-hour debate on the bill.

Political parties

The governing People's Action Party (PAP) has been in power since Singapore's independence in 1965, and is currently led by the Prime Minister Lee Hsien Loong.  Besides the ruling PAP, the other major political parties that may contest the upcoming elections are the Workers' Party of Singapore (WP) led by Low Thia Khiang, the Singapore People's Party led by Chiam See Tong which left the Singapore Democratic Alliance (SDA) in 2011, the Singapore Democratic Party (SDP) led by Chee Soon Juan, the National Solidarity Party (NSP) led by Goh Meng Seng which left the SDA in 2007, the Reform Party (Singapore) led by Kenneth Jeyaretnam, and the Singapore Democratic Alliance (SDA) led by Desmond Lim, which is composed of the Pertubuhan Kebangsaan Melayu Singapura (Singapore Malay National Organization) (PKMS) and the Singapore Justice Party (SJP). The Reform Party is the newest party and was created on 18 June 2008 and was then led by former Member of Parliament J.B. Jeyaretnam. He could have stood for election after he was discharged from bankruptcy and reinstated to the bar, however, Jeyaretnam died of heart failure on 30 September 2008 at the age of 82. His eldest son, Kenneth Jeyaretnam has since taken up leadership of the party and is now its secretary-general.

Electoral divisions

The Electoral Boundaries Review Committee normally publishes an updated list of electoral divisions just before elections are called. Prior to the latest amendments, there were fourteen GRCs, each with five or six seats, and nine Single Member Constituencies (SMC). There were a total of 84 seats being contested in the  general election of 2006.

The new electoral map for 2011 was announced on 24 February 2011.

The changes made in the electoral divisions are as follows:

Nomination

Timeline

New candidates

A total of 78 candidates were brand-new to this election, among which 54 were from six participating opposition parties and 24 were from the ruling People's Action Party. Notable candidates introduced that were part of the "fourth-generation" (4G) cabinet which include a future Deputy Prime Minister of Singapore Heng Swee Keat, an ex-SAF Chief and minister Chan Chun Sing, future Speaker Tan Chuan-Jin, as well as Desmond Lee and Ong Ye Kung, the sons of former MPs Lee Yock Suan and Ong Lian Ten respectively. Opposition candidates include Pritam Singh who made another inroad into Parliament would later become the Workers' Party succeeding leader in 2018, as well as Lina Loh (wife of then-Potong Pasir SMC MP Chiam See Tong), Kenneth Andrew Jeyaretnam (son of the late J. B. Jeyaretnam), Nicole Seah, Tan Jee Say and Benjamin Pwee Yek Guan.

Retiring politicians

20 existing PAP members from the 11th Parliament will not see re-election, among which 18 announced their retirement, ten of which being office holders, and two members, Balaji Sadasivan (Ang Mo Kio GRC) and Ong Chit Chung (Jurong GRC), died during their term in office but neither by-elections were called since their wards were part of a Group Representation Constituency; the latter however would later become a Bukit Batok Single Member Constituency on the next election in 2015. Eric Low, another PAP candidate that first entered politics in the 2001 election but lost twice to WP, did not seek re-election, making him the second PAP candidate to participate but did not enter parliament (the first being Pang Kim Hin).

Staking claims
Soon after the announcement of the new electoral boundaries, various opposition parties indicated their intent to contest, subject to negotiations between political parties to avoid three-cornered fights. The parties declaring an interest to contest each constituency and their nomination status is reflected below.

General election campaign

Televised forum
In the first pre-election forum of this nature in Singapore since the 1988 General Election, Channel NewsAsia invited the main parties to record an hour-long programme.  The programme, in English entitled, “A political forum on Singapore's future” brought together the ruling People's Action Party (PAP) and four opposition parties to discuss long and short-term challenges for the country.

The forum included:
 Singapore Democratic Party, represented by its Assistant Treasurer Dr Vincent Wijeysingha;
 Singapore People's Party, represented by 2nd Vice Chairwoman Lina Chiam;
 Workers' Party of Singapore, represented by Assistant Webmaster Gerald Giam;
 Singapore Democratic Alliance, represented by Assistant Secretary-General Mohamed Nazem Suki;
 People's Action Party, represented by:
 Finance Minister and Jurong GRC MP Tharman Shanmugaratnam
 Bishan–Toa Payoh GRC MP Josephine Teo

Social media
The Worker's Party utilised social media to circumvent obstacles placed in front of them by Singapore's government-controlled media.

Political rallies
The Singapore Police Force announced 41 political rally sites on 27 April which could be booked by political parties on a first-come-first-served basis. Rallies were allowed to be conducted from 28 April to 5 May, from 7am to 10pm. The 41st site is for lunch time rallies at Boat Quay near to the UOB Plaza.

National Solidarity Party

People's Action Party

Reform Party

Singapore Democratic Alliance

Singapore Democratic Party

Singapore People's Party

Workers’ Party

Controversies

Online video
During the 2011 elections campaigning, Vivian Balakrishnan said the SDP was "suppressing a certain YouTube video, which raises some very awkward questions about the agenda and motivations of the SDP and its candidates". He issued the following statement:

I am not sure what [the SDP] strategy is...I can't help feeling that part of the reason for their reticence is they have elements of their agenda they are not prepared to disclose and subject to scrutiny. Eventually, they will have to come out of the closet. (The Straits Times, 20 April 2011)

Vincent Wijeysingha rejected his comments stating, "We've been a very open party and we're very clear."

This incident was cited in an article published in The Economist criticising the ruling party's election strategy The New Paper released a story next day, with the headline: Is Singapore ready for a GAY MP?"  Kenneth Jeyaretnam of the Reform Party called Balakrishnan's campaign a "low attack."

Balakrishnan received widespread controversy and criticism online for his remark,. On 28 April, he told the press: "there is "no need" to further discuss [the] video". He said that his question was a "legitimate".

Cooling-off day controversies
Nicole Seah, a team member contesting Marine Parade GRC under the NSP team, filed a complaint to the Elections Department on 6 May stating PAP-team member Tin Pei Ling had violated the state-mandated cooling-off period 24 hours before polls by posting a Facebook comment "in response to a video [in the state press] that showed Seah crying after being told about a Macpherson female resident who could not get a refund of her son's $80 tuition fees".

The NSP team was advised by the Elections Department to lodge a police report before the Elections Department could investigate.

The day after the election, Seah told reporters that her party had not received any response after making the complaint, and said no decision had been taken on whether or not to pursue the issue. She added that the NSP knew "it is an uphill battle to get any results out of this. I would rather devote my time and resources to the residents".

A similar complaint was lodged against Seah alleging that material had been published on her Facebook page during Cooling-Off Day. On 10 August, the Singapore Police Force announced that it had concluded its investigations into the two incidents, and that aside from a "stern warning" to Tin's friend, neither action was taken against either Tin or Seah.

Separately, the NSP also complained that the PAP had been distributing election material to residents in Tampines GRC in violation of cooling-off regulations.

Results
After polls closed at 8pm, vote counting began. Results were announced by Yam Ah Mee, chief executive director of the People's Association, who acted as the Returning Officer for the election. The first result was declared at 11.58pm on 7 May 2011, where PAP candidate Lim Biow Chuan won the Mountbatten Single Member Constituency with a majority of 3,529.

At 1.31 am on 8 May 2011, the PAP team for Ang Mo Kio Group Representation Constituency was declared to have won the division, putting the PAP's seat tally at 44 seats, and thus formed the government. The final result to be declared was for the Potong Pasir Single Member Constituency at 2.51am on 8 May, where the PAP gained the seat from the SPP on a razor-thin margin of 114 votes.

The political status quo was kept as the People's Action Party won a 13th consecutive term in office since 1959. However, the PAP saw its vote majorities reduced island-wide for a second election in a row. The PAP won 81 seats out of 87 despite losing Aljunied Group Representation Constituency to the WP, which also won in Hougang Single Member Constituency. None of the other five opposition parties won contests, including the SPP which lost Potong Pasir that it held prior to the election. WP marked the first opposition GRC victory since GRCs were introduced in 1988, which resulted in the electoral defeat of Foreign Minister George Yeo and a second Cabinet minister Lim Hwee Hua; both ministers were the first two highest-ranking PAP cabinet ministers to be unseated in the election in post-independence Singapore, with the last time being 1963 (minister Kenneth Michael Byrne lost his seat of Crawford) The PAP also set its lowest national vote share since independence (beating 1991's share of 61.0%), which was just little over 60 per cent, a vote swing of almost negative 7 per cent from 2006.

Excluding electorates from Tanjong Pagar Group Representation Constituency, voter turnout for the election was 93.18%, with 2,060,373 votes cast.

By constituency

Analysis

Top 10 best PAP performers
 Constituencies with no comparison to 2006 were either due to them being new constituencies or the constituencies experiencing walkovers in the last election.

Top 16 best opposition performers
 Constituencies with no comparison to 2006 were either due to them being new constituencies or the constituencies experiencing walkovers in the last election.
 Punggol East SMC is excluded from the table as there were two opposition parties which competed against the incumbent. If the WP's 12,765 votes (41.02%) and the SDA's 1,386 votes (4.45%) were summed up, the opposition won 14,151 votes (45.47%), which would place it fifth in the table below.

Vote Swings
 Only the following constituencies may be compared with 2006 results as they existed in both elections, although most had changes in their electoral boundaries.

Interpretive maps

Post-election events

Ruling party's immediate reactions
The People's Action Party's secretary-general, Prime Minister Lee Hsien Loong, described the results as delivering his party a "clear mandate to form the next government". In his post-election press conference, Lee said the polls had "heightened (voters') political consciousness and awareness", and admitted that "many of them desire to see more opposition voices in Parliament to check the PAP government". He described the PAP's loss of Aljunied GRC, which resulted in George Yeo being voted out of Parliament and losing his position as foreign minister, as a "heavy loss to my Cabinet and my team of MPs", but said that the party would "accept and respect the voters' decision". The country's Senior Minister, Goh Chok Tong, also admitted that "there is a sea change in the political landscape" after his team won Marine Parade Group Representation Constituency with just 56.6 percent of the vote.

Opposition parties' immediate reactions
The Workers Party's secretary-general Low Thia Khiang said his team's win in Aljunied meant that voters had "accepted the WP as a rational, responsible and respected party". In his victory speech, Low declared his win as a "political landmark in modern Singapore". He added that it meant the electorate wanted to tell the PAP to be "a more responsive, inclusive, transparent and accountable government”.

In a statement on its website, the Singapore Democratic Party thanked its supporters for their support, saying that it was for them that the party "(continues) to labour on in this undemocratic system with all the odds stacked against us." Its assistant treasurer Vincent Wijeysingha, who stood in Holland–Bukit Timah Group Representation Constituency, said that the party's positive vote swing in its contested wards of almost 13 percent from the last elections was an "indicator that things are beginning to move up for our party." In a second statement on its website, the SDP described its results as "disappointing", but promised to "build on the foundation that we have laid" for the next elections. The party's secretary-general Chee Soon Juan, barred from standing in the election, went on to write an opinion piece for the Guardian, in which he said it "would have been a miracle" had the SDP won any seats, and accused the media in Singapore of suppressing news of the SDP's campaigning.

Other than the PAP and WP, the only other opposition seat pre-election had been held by the Singapore People's Party, which lost it in the polls by just 114 votes. Chiam See Tong, the SPP's secretary-general, said his party would fight to win back Potong Pasir Single Member Constituency, and said that despite being defeated in Bishan–Toa Payoh Group Representation Constituency, he would continue in politics, health permitting. He also questioned the margin of votes in Potong Pasir, contested by his wife, saying there was "funny business" happening. A petition calling for a by-election in the constituency was started by SPP supporters and Potong Pasir residents.

The National Solidarity Party, which contested the most seats of all opposition parties, admitted it may have taken on too much, with its leader Goh Meng Seng telling reporters that he would be "personally responsible" for the party's failure to win a single seat. Its star candidate, Nicole Seah, said Singaporeans now had to unite as a country. Seah, who contested in Marine Parade, also said there was "so much that needs to be done", and that she would continue her work in the area despite her team's defeat.

The leader of the newest opposition party contesting the elections, the Reform Party's Kenneth Jeyaretnam, described his party as having "learnt a lot" and said they had "done very well", as the first new party in over 20 years. He added that the party was "very happy" at its result in West Coast Group Representation Constituency, and that its second team had done "creditably" in Ang Mo Kio Group Representation Constituency. Jeyaretnam also said the team being able to win the votes it did despite being a new party meant that its "core values resonate with the voters".

The worst-performing party at the polls was the Singapore Democratic Alliance, whose secretary-general Desmond Lim polled under 5 percent of votes in Punggol East Single Member Constituency—the only three-way contest of the election—and lost a S$16,000 election deposit. He said voters had voted based on brand name, as the other opposition candidate in the ward was from the WP. The SDA also contested Pasir Ris–Punggol Group Representation Constituency, and Lim said the party was "very happy" at its positive vote swing from 2006 of over 4 percent. However, the SDA's anchorman in the constituency Harminder Pal Singh described the loss as a "time for painful reflection" and said the party would work harder to win more votes.

Foreign reactions
At an ASEAN heads-of-state meeting in Jakarta, Indonesia, leaders of ASEAN nations reportedly told S. Jayakumar, Singapore's representative at the event, that they were "saddened, disappointed and surprised" at the news that foreign minister Yeo had been defeated, according to the state-run Straits Times, while at the same meeting the Prime Minister of Malaysia, Najib Tun Razak, said the PAP's win would mean a continuity in understanding between the Malaysian and Singaporean governments on bilateral issues. The BBC described it as a landmark result.

Non-Constituency Member of Parliament offers
Three Non-Constituency Members of Parliament (NCMP) seats were offered after the election to the top three losing opposition candidates. The Singapore People's Party accepted the seat for Lina Chiam, ensuring that the Chiam family retained representation in Parliament. While Chiam See Tong has said he is opposed to the scheme, the SPP reasoned that it was "critical" to ensure an "alternative voice in Parliament", to allow the party to "remain engaged in national issues", and to be publicly visible until the next election due by 2016. Mrs Chiam also pointed out that she was "influenced by the wishes of Potong Pasir residents" and she accepted the post as her losing margin was too small.

The Workers' Party was offered the final two NCMP seats for having the second and third best performing losing candidates, which it accepted despite Mr Low also disputing the scheme. Yee Jenn Jong was thus appointed for his performance in Joo Chiat SMC, but as it had to choose one member from the East Coast GRC team, the younger Gerald Giam was chosen over team leader and party treasurer Eric Tan as part of its leadership renewal process. Eric Tan resigned from the party, citing his disagreement with the appointment.

On 16 May 2011, the three proposed NCMPs were formally appointed.

Legacy

Use of social media
The election saw a heavier use of social and online media compared to 2006 Singapore general election, especially to evade censorship in Singapore. It is widely perceived by the populace that the major state-run newspapers and broadcasters "align[ed] itself with the party's ideals and decisions" and that the electoral system was tilted against the Opposition. It had been difficult to create alternative media until the rise of sites such as The Online Citizen and such internet tools such as Facebook, Twitter and blogs, which saw increased significance in the 2006 elections but became especially prominent in the 2011 elections.
 According to The Economist, the PAP's aggressive modernisation of Singapore created "one of the world's most wired societies," leading to new media that "transformed" the electoral scene in Singapore. Characterising the state-run mainstream press as "docile", the Economist also argued that this also forced significantly more news coverage of the Opposition than in previous elections, since the mainstream media feared their readership deserting them. One blogger from CNN wrote, "Thanks to social media, it doesn't matter that the country's largely state-run media leans towards reporting the actions of the PAP, no one's reading anyway.". The Economist however was more cynical in its analysis of the election: "in Singapore, winning 7% of parliamentary seats is tantamount to an opposition triumph".

The first election in which a GRC was won by the Opposition
Traditionally regarded as a PAP "fortress", a GRC fell to the opposition for the first time in Singapore's political history.
In previous elections, the Opposition had never won a GRC, which ostensibly ensure minority representation in parliament but also shut out smaller opposition parties with less resources. GRCs comprise over 86% of the seats, but the Opposition in previous elections would contest "less than half the seats". The election saw the most extensive use of co-ordination to avoid "three-cornered fights" and was also notable for seeing "two veteran MPs" making immense risks by choosing to contest in GRCs rather than their historical SMC strongholds.

Signals to the ruling party
The election results were widely used in national and international discussions that the population
was trying to send a message to a ruling party that "can also come across as smug, arrogant and high-handed" despite a win margin of over 20%, which usually counts as a landslide victory for most democratic nations but has been one of the narrowest margins since 1965. The last election with a similarly narrow victory occurred in the 1963 Singapore general election, when the PAP's major opponent was the Barisan Sosialis—which in itself was a splinter group formed from the leftist wing of the PAP, where it had comprised 80% of the PAP grassroots membership, 35 out of the PAP's 51 branch committees and 19 of its 23 organising secretaries. According to the Economist, Singaporeans would prefer not to have an alternative government but a humbler one, as well as a "stronger opposition".

On 14 May, exactly a week after the election, Senior Minister Goh Chok Tong and Minister Mentor Lee Kuan Yew announced in a joint statement that they would be quitting the country's Cabinet, saying it was time for a "team of younger ministers" to "engage with this young generation in shaping the future of Singapore." In a similar analysis by Bloomberg, the resignations and the ensuing cabinet reshuffle were the actions of a ruling party "seeking to overhaul its image with voters" whose "narrowest election victory on record signaled a shortfall in support among younger voters". Analysts such as Citigroup economist Kit Wei Zheng believed that  Minister Lee had contributed to the PAP's poor performance.

Lee Kuan Yew was also quoted as saying that a younger generation was required to "carry Singapore forward in a more difficult and complex situation" while Lee Hsien Loong declared the party "would change the way it governs" and do some "soul-searching". A Singapore Management University professor said "[The PAP] will have to demonstrate that it remains a mass movement, and not [Lee Kuan Yew]’s alter ego," noting that younger Singaporeans do not see Lee Kuan Yew with the same godlike perception as older Singaporeans born before 1980.

Further retirements
Both losing ministers in Aljunied GRC, George Yeo and Minister in the Prime Minister's Office Lim Hwee Hua, announced their retirements from politics in separate news conferences given in the days after the election.  George Yeo, who remained popular online and continued to have "a flood of support" after the election and had been repeatedly urged to contest the next election, or even contest the 2011 Singaporean presidential election turned his supporters down, declaring, "I'm a free spirit, and I don't think I'm temperamentally suited for such a job."

See also
 Elections in Singapore
 Constituencies of Singapore
 List of Singaporean electoral divisions
 List of political parties in Singapore
 2012 Hougang by-election and 2013 Punggol East by-election - two by-elections held after the election

Notes

References

External links

 Official elections webpage – Elections Department Singapore
 News about the General Election by MediaCorp
Other official information
 Parliamentary Elections Act  Singapore Statutes Online, Chapter 218

Singapore
2011 in Singapore
May 2011 events in Asia
 
General elections in Singapore